Yanni Hufnagel (born August 26, 1982) is an American entrepreneur, former college basketball coach, and the founder and CEO of Atlanta-based The Lemon Perfect Company, maker of the enhanced water brand Lemon Perfect. Before starting Lemon Perfect, he served as an assistant coach of the Nevada Wolf Pack men's basketball team under Eric Musselman.

He previously served as an assistant coach for the California Golden Bears, Vanderbilt Commodores, and Harvard Crimson. Hufnagel was regarded as one of the top recruiters in college basketball.

Early life and education
Hufnagel was raised in Scarsdale, New York and is Jewish. He played lacrosse for Scarsdale High School and was a team captain. After being cut from Scarsdale High School's varsity basketball team, he took a position as the color commentator for the team's games on a local access cable TV channel.

He attended Pennsylvania State University for one year, where he was a defenseman on the lacrosse team. Hufnagel then transferred to Cornell University, where he served as a student manager for the Big Red men's basketball team. At Cornell, Hufnagel earned a Bachelor of Science degree in Industrial and Labor Relations in 2006.

Hufnagel began his coaching career as an intern with the New Jersey Nets before attending the University of Oklahoma, where he served as a graduate assistant coach for the Sooners men's basketball team. Hufnagel is credited with helping develop Blake Griffin while at Oklahoma. At Oklahoma, Hufnagel earned a master's degree in Adult and Higher Education with an Emphasis in Intercollegiate Athletics Administration in 2010.

Career

Coaching

Harvard Crimson, Maccabiah Games
In June 2009, Hufnagel joined the Harvard Crimson men's basketball program as an assistant coach under Tommy Amaker. In 2011, he was voted by his peers in a CBS Sports survey as the mid-major assistant coach most likely to "make it big time due to his recruiting ability." He was named to a CBS Sports college basketball "dream team" of assistant coaches before the 2012-13 season and labeled "one of the most relentless and energetic recruiters in the game." He is also noted for his role in helping develop Jeremy Lin and Wesley Saunders at Harvard. In Hufnagel’s four years with Harvard, the school went 90-30, and in his final season, Harvard upset New Mexico in the 2013 NCAA Division I men's basketball tournament.

Hufnagel was appointed to coach the Team USA Youth Team at the 19th Maccabiah Games in Israel but declined in order to accept an assistant coaching position with the Vanderbilt Commodores.

Vanderbilt Commodores, California Golden Bears, allegation of sexual harassment, Nevada Wolf Pack
In May 2013, Hufnagel joined the Vanderbilt Commodores as an assistant coach under Kevin Stallings. He was credited by ESPN with helping Vanderbilt land the 29th-ranked 2014 recruiting class, which included Wade Baldwin IV and Matthew Fisher-Davis. After one season, Hufnagel left the program.

In 2014, Hufnagel joined the California Golden Bears coaching staff, led by Cuonzo Martin. Hufnagel is credited with helping recruit Jaylen Brown and Ivan Rabb to the team. The pair helped lead the Golden Bears to a 2016 NCAA Tournament berth.

In 2015, a reporter covering the Golden Bears filed a sexual harassment complaint against Hufnagel, in which she claimed that after she rejected his repeated advances, he ceased giving her recruiting information, resulting in her losing her job. Following an investigation, Hufnagel was fired on March 14, 2016 for violating UC Berkeley's sexual harassment policy. In response, Hufnagel's lawyer, Mary McNamara, asserted the extent of the relationship was a "flirtation that never went anywhere" and noted that the reporter told investigators Hufnagel "never touched her."

On April 8, 2016, Hufnagel accepted an assistant coaching position with Eric Musselman and the University of Nevada Wolf Pack men's basketball team. The hire was strongly supported by UNR President, Marc Johnson, who publicly noted that the release of hundreds of text messages presented by Hufnagel's attorney should help ease concerns from students and staff about his hire. Hufnagel did not present text messages in the UC Berkeley investigation. Hufnagel and Nevada mutually parted ways after one season.

Lemon Perfect
In December 2017, Hufnagel founded Lemon Perfect, a flavored lemon water brand in the enhanced water category. Lemon Perfect was named one of the "Best New Products" at BevNET's Best of 2019 Awards.

In January 2020, the company received a viral boost after the product was spotted in a photo on Beyoncé's Instagram.

In August 2020, the company announced that it had raised $11.6 million in funding to date from a network of investors, including Spencer Dinwiddie, Channing Frye, Lindsay Gottlieb, Blake Griffin, Josh Hart, Kyle Kuzma, Meyers Leonard, De'Anthony Melton, and Nick Young.

In April 2022, Lemon Perfect closed a $31 million dollar Series A funding round. Beyoncé was a Series A investor, along with Beechwood Capital, NNS Capital, and Trousdale Ventures. The investment gives Lemon Perfect total funding of over $42.2 million and a total valuation of over $100 million.

References

External links

Twitter

1982 births
Living people
California Golden Bears men's basketball coaches
Cornell Big Red men's basketball coaches
Cornell University alumni
Pennsylvania State University alumni
University of Oklahoma alumni
Harvard Crimson men's basketball coaches
Nevada Wolf Pack men's basketball coaches
Vanderbilt Commodores men's basketball coaches
People from Scarsdale, New York
Sportspeople from New York (state)